Chanda Sharma is an Indian actress, known for Salaam Bombay! (1988), Family Pride (1991) and London's Burning (1988). She also appears in numerous television series.

Filmography

Film

Television

References

External links

20th-century Indian actresses
21st-century Indian actresses
Indian film actresses
Indian television actresses
Actresses in Hindi cinema
Actresses in Hindi television
Living people
Year of birth missing (living people)